Cezar Jesus Ferreira (born February 15, 1985), better known in his home country Brazil as Cezar Mutante, is a mixed martial artist currently competing in the light heavyweight division. A professional MMA competitor since 2007, he has competed for the Ultimate Fighting Championship and Professional Fighters League. He was also the inaugural winner of Globo's The Ultimate Fighter: Brazil

Background
Ferreira was born in Catanduva, but grew up in Ibitinga, São Paulo. He began training capoeira at the age of six. Cezar grew up wrestling and practicing Brazilian jiu-jitsu throughout his childhood and adolescence. Viewing tapes of UFC Hall of Famer Royce Gracie fighting caused his interest in Brazilian jiu-jitsu and MMA to grow. However, after having a rough home life and having to leave at seventeen years old, Mutante found Vitor Belfort who took him in as his own son, helping to raise him and take care of him. Belfort began training Ferreira in MMA at his gym.

Mixed martial arts career

Early career
On April 29, 2007, Ferreira made his professional debut in a one-night middleweight tournament for Xtreme Fighting Championships in Brazil. He fought Andre Severo, winning via TKO at 1:29 of round one. In the next round of the tournament, Ferreira suffered his first defeat, losing to Antônio Braga Neto via decision. Ferreira took a long leave of absences from fighting after his wife got pregnant.

Three years after his debut, Ferreira returned to active competition, fighting on the Bitetti Combat 6 card against Felipe Arinelli. Ferreira won the fight after choking Arinelli unconscious with a D'arce choke in the second round. Only a few months later Ferreira, again, fought for Bitetti Combat, fighting on their seventh event. He defeated Cassiano Ricardo Castanho de Freitas via TKO (doctor stoppage) in the second round.

Ferreira then traveled to Las Vegas, Nevada, United States to train with Vitor at Xtreme Couture. He was placed on the Ring of Fire 40 card in Broomfield, Colorado, on April 16, 2011. Ferreira defeated Chaun Sims via knockout only 17 seconds into round one. Ferreira took his second professional defeat at Superior Cage Combat 2 in Las Vegas, Nevada on August 20, 2011, losing to Elvis Mutapčić via one-punch knockout.

The Ultimate Fighter
In March 2012, it was revealed that Mutante was selected to be a participant on The Ultimate Fighter: Brazil. Mutante defeated Gustavo Sampaio by submission with a guillotine choke in the second round to move into the Ultimate Fighter house, and become an official cast member.

Mutante was selected as the first pick (second overall) by his mentor and real-life coach Vitor Belfort to be a part of Team Vitor. In the second Middleweight fight of the season, Mutante was selected to fight Leonardo Mafra. Mutante won via submission (guillotine choke) in the second round. He was then scheduled to face Thiago Perpetuo for a spot in the final against Daniel Sarafian. He defeated Perpetuo by knockout (head kick) and was expected to face Sérgio Moraes, who replaced for Sarafian due to an injury.

Ultimate Fighting Championship
Mutante was expected to make his UFC debut on June 23, 2012, at UFC 147 against Daniel Sarafian to determine the winner of The Ultimate Fighter: Brazil. However, Sarafian injured himself and was forced out of the bout and replaced by Sérgio Moraes. Ferreira won the fight via unanimous decision.

Ferreira was expected to face C. B. Dollaway on May 18, 2013, at UFC on FX 8.  However, Dollaway was forced out of the bout with an injury and was replaced by Chris Camozzi.  Then on April 7, Ferreira pulled out of the fight as well, citing an injury and was replaced by Rafael Natal.

Ferreira was expected to face Clint Hester on August 3, 2013, at UFC 163. However, Hester was forced out of the bout and Ferreira instead faced promotional newcomer Thiago Santos. He won the fight via submission in the first round.

Ferreira faced Daniel Sarafian on November 9, 2013, at UFC Fight Night 32. He won the fight via split decision (28–29, 30–27, and 30–28).

The bout with C. B. Dollaway eventually took place on March 23, 2014, at UFC Fight Night 38. Ferreira lost via TKO in the first round.

Ferreira faced Andrew Craig on June 28, 2014, at UFC Fight Night 44. He won the fight via unanimous decision.

Ferreira faced Sam Alvey on February 22, 2015, at UFC Fight Night 61.  Alvey won the fight via knockout in the first round.

Ferreira faced Jorge Masvidal in a welterweight bout on July 12, 2015, at The Ultimate Fighter 21 Finale. He lost the fight via knockout in the first round.

Ferreira was expected to face Caio Magalhães on April 16, 2016, at UFC on Fox 19. However, Magalhães pulled out of the fight in the week leading up to the event citing an ankle injury and was replaced by Oluwale Bamgbose. Ferreira won the fight via unanimous decision.

Ferreira next faced Anthony Smith on July 8, 2016, at The Ultimate Fighter 23 Finale. He won the fight via unanimous decision.

Ferreira faced Jack Hermansson on November 19, 2016, at UFC Fight Night 100. He won the fight via submission in the second round and was awarded a Performance of the Night bonus.

Ferreira faced Elias Theodorou on February 19, 2017, at UFC Fight Night 105. He lost the fight via unanimous decision.

Ferreira faced Nate Marquardt on November 11, 2017, at UFC Fight Night 120. He won the fight via split decision.

Ferreira faced Karl Roberson on May 12, 2018, at UFC 224. He won the fight via technical submission in the first round.

Ferreira was expected to face Tom Breese on November 17, 2018, at UFC Fight Night 140. However, it was reported on November 9, 2018, that Breese pulled out of the event due to injury, and he was replaced by Ian Heinisch. He lost the fight via unanimous decision.

The pairing with Breese was rescheduled and was expected to take place on March 16, 2019, at UFC Fight Night 147. However, on February 1, 2019, Ferreira withdrew from the fight on February 1, citing a knee injury.

Ferreira faced Marvin Vettori on July 13, 2019, at UFC Fight Night 155. He lost the fight via unanimous decision.

Professional Fighters League 
In March 2020, Ferreira signed with Professional Fighters League.

Ferreira faced Nick Roehrick on April 29, 2021, at PFL 2 as the start of the 2021 PFL Light Heavyweight tournament. He won the fight via knockout 37 seconds into the first round.

Ferreira faced Chris Camozzi at PFL 5 on June 17, 2021. He lost the bout via unanimous decision.

Ferreira faced Marthin Hamlet in the Semifinals off the Light Heavyweight tournament on August 27, 2021, at PFL 9. Off his very first kick, Ferreira injured his hamstring, which sent him down to the canvas and the fight was called.

Championships and awards

Mixed martial arts
Ultimate Fighting Championship
The Ultimate Fighter: Brazil Middleweight Tournament Winner

Mixed martial arts record

|-
|Loss
|align=center|14–10
|Marthin Hamlet
|TKO (leg injury)
|PFL 9
|
|align=center|1
|align=center|0:13
|Hollywood, Florida, United States
|
|-
|Loss
|align=center|14–9
|Chris Camozzi
|Decision (unanimous)
|PFL 5
|
|align=center|3
|align=center|5:00
|Atlantic City, New Jersey, United States
|
|-
|Win
|align=center|14–8
|Nick Roehrick
|KO (punches)
|PFL 2
|
|align=center|1
|align=center|0:37
|Atlantic City, New Jersey, United States
|
|-
|Loss
|align=center|13–8
|Marvin Vettori
|Decision (unanimous)
|UFC Fight Night: de Randamie vs. Ladd
|
|align=center|3
|align=center|5:00
|Sacramento, California, United States
|
|-
|Loss
|align=center|13–7
|Ian Heinisch
|Decision (unanimous)
|UFC Fight Night: Magny vs. Ponzinibbio
|
|align=center|3
|align=center|5:00
|Buenos Aires, Argentina
|
|-
|Win
|align=center|13–6
|Karl Roberson
|Technical Submission (arm-triangle choke)
|UFC 224
|
|align=center|1
|align=center|4:45
|Rio de Janeiro, Brazil
|
|-
|Win
|align=center|12–6
|Nate Marquardt
|Decision (split)
|UFC Fight Night: Poirier vs. Pettis
|
|align=center|3
|align=center|5:00
|Norfolk, Virginia, United States
|
|-
|Loss
|align=center|11–6
|Elias Theodorou
|Decision (unanimous)
|UFC Fight Night: Lewis vs. Browne
|
|align=center|3
|align=center|5:00
|Halifax, Nova Scotia, Canada
|
|-
|Win
|align=center|11–5
|Jack Hermansson
|Submission (arm-triangle choke)
|UFC Fight Night: Bader vs. Nogueira 2
|
|align=center|2
|align=center|2:11
|São Paulo, Brazil
|
|-
|Win
|align=center|10–5
|Anthony Smith
|Decision (unanimous)
|The Ultimate Fighter: Team Joanna vs. Team Cláudia Finale
|
|align=center|3
|align=center|5:00
|Las Vegas, Nevada, United States
|
|-
|Win
|align=center|9–5
|Oluwale Bamgbose
|Decision (unanimous)
|UFC on Fox: Teixeira vs. Evans
|
|align=center|3
|align=center|5:00
|Tampa, Florida, United States
|
|-
|Loss
|align=center|8–5
|Jorge Masvidal
|KO (elbow and punches)
|The Ultimate Fighter: American Top Team vs. Blackzilians Finale
|
|align=center|1
|align=center|4:22
|Las Vegas, Nevada, United States
|
|-
|Loss
|align=center|8–4
|Sam Alvey
|KO (punches)
|UFC Fight Night: Bigfoot vs. Mir
|
|align=center|1
|align=center|3:34
|Porto Alegre, Brazil
|
|-
|Win
|align=center|8–3
|Andrew Craig
|Decision (unanimous)
|UFC Fight Night: Swanson vs. Stephens
| 
|align=center|3
|align=center|5:00
|San Antonio, Texas, United States
|
|-
|Loss
|align=center|7–3
|C. B. Dollaway
|KO (punches)
|UFC Fight Night: Shogun vs. Henderson 2
|
|align=center|1
|align=center|0:39
|Natal, Brazil
|
|-
|Win
|align=center|7–2
|Daniel Sarafian
|Decision (split)
|UFC Fight Night: Belfort vs. Henderson 2
|
|align=center|3
|align=center|5:00
|Goiânia, Brazil
|
|-
|Win
|align=center|6–2
|Thiago Santos
|Submission (guillotine choke)
|UFC 163
|
|align=center|1
|align=center|0:47
|Rio de Janeiro, Brazil
|
|-
|Win
|align=center|5–2
|Sérgio Moraes
|Decision (unanimous)
|UFC 147
|
|align=center|3
|align=center|5:00
|Belo Horizonte, Brazil
|
|-
|Loss
|align=center|4–2
|Elvis Mutapčić
|KO (punch)
|Superior Cage Combat 2
|
|align=center|1
|align=center|0:25
|Las Vegas, Nevada, United States
|
|-
|Win
|align=center|4–1
|Chaun Sims
|KO (punch)
|Ring of Fire 40
|
|align=center|1
|align=center|0:17
|Broomfield, Colorado, United States
|
|-
|Win
|align=center|3–1
|Cassiano de Freitas
|TKO (doctor stoppage)
|Bitetti Combat 7
|
|align=center|2
|align=center|3:37
|Rio de Janeiro, Brazil
|
|-
|Win
|align=center|2–1
|Felipe Arinelli
|Technical Submission (D'Arce choke)
|Bitetti Combat 6
|
|align=center|2
|align=center|0:55
|Brasília, Brazil
|
|-
|Loss
|align=center|1–1
|Antônio Braga Neto
|Decision (unanimous)
|XFC Brazil 1
|
|align=center|1
|align=center|10:00
|Rio de Janeiro, Brazil
|
|-
|Win
|align=center|1–0
|André Severo
|TKO (punches)
|XFC Brazil 1
|
|align=center|1
|align=center|1:29
|Rio de Janeiro, Brazil
|

Mixed martial arts exhibition record

|-
| Win
|align=center| 3–0
|  Thiago Perpétuo
| KO (head kick)
| The Ultimate Fighter: Brazil
| 
|align=center| 1
|align=center| 1:26
| Brazil
| 
|-
| Win
|align=center| 2–0
|  Leonardo Mafra
| Submission (guillotine choke)
| The Ultimate Fighter: Brazil
|
|align=center| 2
|align=center| 1:05
| Brazil
| 
|-
| Win
|align=center| 1–0
|  Gustavo Sampaio
| Submission (guillotine choke)
| The Ultimate Fighter: Brazil
|
|align=center| 1
|align=center| 1:36
| Brazil
|

See also
 List of male mixed martial artists

References

External links
 Cezar Ferreira at PFL
 
 

1985 births
Living people
Middleweight mixed martial artists
Brazilian male mixed martial artists
Mixed martial artists utilizing capoeira
Mixed martial artists utilizing wrestling
Mixed martial artists utilizing Brazilian jiu-jitsu
The Ultimate Fighter winners
Brazilian practitioners of Brazilian jiu-jitsu
Brazilian capoeira practitioners
Brazilian male sport wrestlers
People awarded a black belt in Brazilian jiu-jitsu
Ultimate Fighting Championship male fighters
Sportspeople from São Paulo (state)
People from Ibitinga
People from Catanduva